Belmonte Castello is a comune (municipality) in the Province of Frosinone in the Italian region Lazio, located about  southeast of Rome and about  east of Frosinone.

Belmonte Castello borders the following municipalities: Atina, Sant'Elia Fiumerapido, Terelle, Villa Latina.

References

Cities and towns in Lazio